The Freedom Online Coalition is a group of 34 governments that work together to advance Internet freedom, mainly through shaping global norms through Joint Statements, multistakeholder engagement with their Advisory Network and through coordinating diplomatic initiatives and interventions at relevant international forums. The Freedom Online Coalition was launched at a conference of the Dutch Government  in The Hague, the Netherlands in December 2011.

Participating countries commit to "promoting the freedoms of expression, association, and peaceful assembly with respect to the Internet and connection technologies".  They endorse the principle that the human rights that people have offline should enjoy the same protection online, including freedom of assembly and the right to organize and the right to be protected from "arbitrary" intrusions into their privacy. Its work builds on the resolution on "The Promotion, Protection and Enjoyment of Human Rights on the Internet" adopted by United Nations Human Rights Council in July 2012. The coalition has also endorsed a set of recommendations for cybersecurity policy making that respects human rights as well as a definition of cybersecurity.

The group has held annual meetings in The Netherlands (2011), Kenya (2012), Tunisia (2013), Estonia (2014), Mongolia (2015), Costa Rica (2016), Germany (2018), Ghana (2020), and Finland (2021).  The group has 34 member countries (2021).  In 2022, the Chairship of the Freedom Online Coalition is held by the Government of Canada and the chairing advisors are Bernard Shen, Microsoft and Mallory Knodel, Center for Democracy and Technology (formerly representing ARTICLE 19).

References

External links
Freedom Online Coalition, official website

Global policy organizations
Human rights organizations